The Iran national ice hockey team is the national men's ice hockey team of Iran. The team was founded in June 2016, is controlled by the Islamic Republic of Iran Skating Federation, and on 26 September 2019, became an associate member of the International Ice Hockey Federation (IIHF). Iran made its debut in the IIHF World Championship in 2022. As of 2022, Iran is ranked 56th in the IIHF World Ranking.

History

Ice hockey in Iran
Back in the 1970s, ice hockey was played as a recreation sport by the general public at the "Ice Palace" which was located in Pahlavi Street before Vanak Square, there was also another ice rink located in Aryamehr Sport Complex which was only used for ice skating. As a result of Iranian Revolution, ice hockey and skating became banned, hence ice rinks got closed down. Today, hockey is an exclusively all-male sport in Iran.

Farzad Houshidari was among the first Iranians who played ice hockey abroad, and helped start ice hockey in Iran. Daniel Rahimi, Mika Zibanejad and Rhett Rakhshani, who all have Iranian heritage, were selected in the NHL Entry Draft, with Zibanejad and Rakhshani playing in the NHL. Both Rahimi and Zibanejad represented Sweden in international competitions while Rakhshani represented the United States. Currently there are two players of Iranian-origin in Oman, Mustafa Hamedi and Ali Reza Rasoli. Umut Taherzadeh have represented Turkey internationally. Other notable players are Mark Ardelan, Ryan Mior, Farzad Khojasteh and Arian Ali-Zade.

There are currently four Ice Rinks which are Aramis Sports Complex (Tehran), Damoon Shopping Center (Kish Island) and Padide Shandiz Shopping Center (Mashhad), which were respectively opened in 2013, 2014 and 2015. There is a standard Ice Rink called Ice Box, located in Iran Mall, Tehran, that was opened in 2019. Slashing, spearing, and stabbing are not penalized in Iranian hockey.

In July 2015, Taylan Aytac from Turkey, taught in Iran's first ice hockey workshop which was held in Aramis Sports Complex in Tehran, which was also attended by Iranian trainee-instructors Pooya Ghandali and Saman Goodarzi.

On 1 October 2016, the first ice hockey match was played between two Iranian club teams in a friendly in Padide Ice Rink in Mashhad, Padide defeated Khorasan Razavi 5–4. Both teams have been training twice a day since September 2016.

National team
As of 2015, Iran decided to form a national ice hockey team with the intention of participating at the 2017 Asian Winter Games. A team was formed in the first quarter of 2016 after Iran made a campaign of recruiting players of Iranian heritage who live abroad. In order to fast track the creation of a national team, the coaching staff decided that it would be best to select players from the Iranian inline hockey national team powered by hockey players of Iranian-origin from abroad. In 2016, three national camps were held, 26–28 June in Asiago (Italy), 20–27 August in Almaty (Kazakhstan) and 21–24 December in Dubai (United Arab Emirates). In each camp players were coached by three different instructors, Christian Müller from Germany, Former head coach of Kyrgyzstan and Yenbek Almaty, Sergei Shavernev from Kazakhstan, and head coach of Dubai White Bears, Troy Kahler from Canada.

On 23 August 2016, Iran national team played its first match against a non-Iranian team. Iran won 5–4 over Kazakh team HC Almaty in the city of Almaty in Kazakhstan.

Iran was supposed to participate at the 2017 Asian Winter Games, but was disqualified after a number of Iranian players were deemed ineligible to compete in the regional games. Reported concerns leading to the disqualification includes some players failing to reside in Iran for at least three years despite having Iranian heritage, and claims of some players having represented other countries. Games were supposed to be the team's first tournament.

The Olympic Council of Asia allowed Iran to play its scheduled games at the Asian Winter Games but the matches were considered exhibition games and results did not count in the competition standings. Iran's first official match against other national team was a 7–1 loss to Macau in Sapporo, Japan. The game was supposed to be Iran's first match at the Asian Winter Games if they were not disqualified. They won 10–3 in their second exhibition game against Indonesia.

Tournament record

World Championship

Asian Winter Games

Current staff
Head coach:  Kaveh Sedghi
Assistant coach:  Vladislav Lomakin
Assistant coach:  Yuriy Lomakin

Managerial history
 Christian Müller 2016–2017
 Kaveh Sedghi 2018–present

Captains history
Shahryar Amini 2016–2017
Farzad Houshidari 2018–present

All-time record against other nations
Last match update: 07 March 2022

Results

Unofficial
 2021 UAE Ice Hockey Tournament, Dubai Cup (Men and Women)
 2022 4 friendly Match (as Online Tire) with Gümüş Patenler SK, Ankara, Turkey (Men) : 3-7 / 7-7 / 9-6 / 7-7
 2022 2 friendly Match with KGZ U20 (Men) : Iran U20 0-4 / Iran Senior 3-5
 2022 IIHF Women's World Championship Division III - Women withdraw
 2023 1st Islamic Countries Ice Hockey Championship (Men and Women)

References

External links

IIHF profile

National ice hockey teams in Asia
Ice hockey